"Send Them/Entropy (Hip Hop Reconstruction from the Ground Up)", is a double A side EP by Asia Born (now known as Lyrics Born) and DJ Shadow and the Groove Robbers. This was released 1993 from Solesides. Parts of this were later featured on the retrospective album Solesides Greatest Bumps.

Release
Following the release of several early singles on Hollywood Records, DJ Shadow then started his own imprint, Solesides, and this was the first record to be released on this label, with a track from future collaborator and fellow Quannum Projects member Asia Born. This was a 12" single, numbered "SS001," featuring DJ Shadow's 17-minute epic, "Entropy" on one side, described as 'One continuous track moving from upbeat deck-work and bin shuddering beats, through thick, downtempo head music."

Lyrics Born (then known as Asia Born) featured on the other side with the song, "Send Them.", which received somewhat less acclaim, labelled by Allmusic as a 'Forgettable vehicle" for his talents.

The white-label 12" was preceded by a cassette single version of the release and both have fetched high dollars in the re-sale market. Only 400 cassettes and 200 12" vinyl singles were originally pressed up and sold on consignment in record stores in the Bay Area. It has since been very widely bootlegged, due to the initial limited run, and both artists' greater success following this. The original vinyl copies can be identified, as the 'deadwax' (the smooth part following the actual recorded part of the vinyl) is inscribed "Reconstruction Continues" on the "Entropy" side, and " For Dad" on the "Send Them" side.

Track listing

Side A
 Send Them
 Send Them (Instrumental)
 Count and Estimate (Dub)

Side B
 Entropy
 a) Intropy
 b) The Third Decade, Our Move
 c) Count & Estimate
 d) B-Boy's Revenge
 e) Back To Back Breaks
 f) DJ Shadow's Theme
 g) Endtropy

Entropy
Entropy is an 18-minute 'sound collage', divided into 7 parts. It has been described as "The first defining moment in his (DJ Shadow's) career" DJ Shadow's style is usually made up of very short samples of other records, of which he has over 60,000.

Samples used in Entropy

b) The Third Decade, Our Move
Contains samples of:
Jack McDuff - "Jelly Jam" (drums)
Lou Rawls -"Stormy Monday"
"the moonlight shines on funky city..", Blowfly - "Zodiac Blowfly (Side B)"
"tell 'em who the fuck I am", Style - "The Assassinator"
"we sample beats you sue and try to fight us", Big Daddy Kane - "Young, Gifted and Black"
"in the middle of a stable with a turntable", The 45 King - "The 900 Number (YZ Acappella Vocal)"
"new", Steinski & Mass Media - "We'll Be Right Back"
"spinning on the turntables back to back", Whodini - "The Haunted House of Rock"

c) Count & Estimate
Contains samples of:
Pete Rock & C.L. Smooth - HARD TO THE LEFT Rap Party (Dub version only)
Don Thompson - "Just Plain Funk"
The Meters - "Look-Ka Py Py"
Eric B & Rakim - "Eric B Is President"
Biz Markie - "Nobody Beats The Biz"
"last", Grandmaster Flash - "Freelance"
"count and estimate about a thousand dead", Uptown - "Dope On Plastic"
"about 100 or more..", GangStarr - "2 Deep"
"this was a goddamn slaughter", The Genius - "Phony As Ya Wanna Be"
"next thing you know you're being buried and planted", MC Shan - "Go For Yours ('Cause I'm Gonna Get Mine)"
Skull Snaps - "I Turn My Back On Love"
BarKays - "Street Walker"

d) B-Boy's Revenge
Contains samples of:
"do you have a motor? show it to me..", Bright Lights - "Motor City Funk"
"We're comin' out on the Italian tip..", from an interview with The Lordz Of Brooklyn
"rappin for the white man", Pharcyde - "It's Jiggaboo Time"
"listen up psycopath..", Master Ace - "Brooklyn Battles"
"please man, don't get with that bullshit", LL Cool J - "El Shabazz"
"that ain't shit y'all", MC Shan - "I Pioneered This"
"fuck off", De La Soul - "Afro Connection At The Hi-Five (In The Eyes Of A Hoodlum)"
"new jacks trying to monopolize..", Grandmixer DST - "The Home Of Hip-Hop"

e) Back To Back Breaks
Contains samples of:
"if a beat is not for sale then...yup we gotta have it", MC Lyte - "10% Dis"
Les Demerle - "Moondial"
Baby Huey - "Hard Times"
Simtec & Wylie - "Bootleggin'"
Wilbur Bascomb And The Zodiact - "Just Groove in 'G'"
Bernard Purdie - "Soul Drums"

f) DJ Shadow's Theme
Contains samples of:
"the stage is set..", the voice of Stan Lee
Bob James - "Valley Of The Shadows"
Bob James - "Feel Like Making Love"
Curtis Knight - "Hi-Low" (drums)
Richard Roundtree - "Lovin'"
Joe Thomas - "Chitlins And Chuchifritos" (bassline stab)
Southside Movement - "I've Been Watching You"
Black Heat - "Zimbaku"
Bad Bascomb - "Woman Connoisseur"

Entropy (Hip Hop Reconstruction from the Ground Up)

Entropy (Hip Hop Reconstruction from the Ground up), is the B-side of the record.

Personnel
Josh Davis (aka DJ Shadow)- Production and sampling on "Entropy" and "Count and Estimate (Dub)"
Tom Shimura (aka Asia Born)- Vocals and production on "Send Them"

References

External links

Official website
Quannum Projects
Solesides

1993 EPs
DJ Shadow albums
Lyrics Born albums